David Hirschfelder (born 18 November 1960, Ballarat, Victoria) is an Australian musician, film score composer and performer. As a musician he has been a member of Little River Band and John Farnham Band. He has composed film scores for many films, including Strictly Ballroom, Australia, The Railway Man, The Water Diviner and The Dressmaker. He was nominated for Academy Awards for his scores for Shine and Elizabeth.

Musician
As a keyboardist, Hirschfelder has been a member of various groups including the jazz fusion band Pyramid, rock band Peter Cupples Band (1980), pop rockers Little River Band (1983–1986), Blowout, Dragon (1987, 1989), adult contemporary singer John Farnham's backing band (1986–1992), and jazz fusion supergroup CAB.

In 1980 Hirschfelder joined the Peter Cupples Band, Cupples had just left his soul-pop group, Stylus, and formed the rock group with Hirschfelder on keyboards, Virgil Donati on drums, Ross Ingliss on guitar and Robert Little on bass guitar. In October 1981 Peter Cupples Band released his debut album, Fear of Thunder. In 1982 Hirschfelder provided piano on Little River Band's album, Greatest Hits. Their next album, The Net had Hirschfelder on keyboards and as co-producer, with the band's line-up including Farnham on lead vocals, Beeb Birtles on guitars and vocals, Graeham Goble on guitars and vocals, Stephen Housden on guitar and backing vocals, Wayne Nelson on bass guitar and vocals, and Derek Pellicci on drums and percussion. He joined the group in September 1983, as they toured in the United States. Their 1984 album, Playing to Win saw Hirschfelder supplying guitar, piano, keyboards, synthesiser, programming and vocals. He also co-wrote the tracks, "When Cathedrals Were White", "Blind Eyes" and "Playing to Win". The latter two were issued as singles, with "Playing to Win" reaching the Billboard Hot 100 in March 1985 and Top 100 on the Australian Kent Music Report Singles Chart. In mid-1986 the group issued No Reins which had Hirschfelder on piano, keyboards and co-writing "Paper Paradise".

After No Reins had been recorded, Hirschfelder left Little River Band to return to Australia and joined Farnham's backing band. In April–June 1986 Farnham recorded his album, Whispering Jack with Hirschfelder on keyboards, drum programs and co-writing "Going, Going, Gone". For touring in support of the album Farnham and Hirschfelder were joined on the Jack's Back Tour by Angus Burchill (or Burchall) on drums, Brett Garsed on lead guitar, and Greg Macainsh on bass guitar (Skyhooks). At that time, Jack's Back Tour was the highest-grossing tour by an Australian act. Hirschfelder remained with Farnham for the studio albums, Age of Reason (July 1988) and Chain Reaction (September 1990). Between these two albums he released his own, Welcome to the Nightclub of My Mind in 1989. In 1992 Hirschfelder left Farnham's backing band to concentrate on his score work for television and feature films. In 1999 he collaborated with David Hobson for the song cycle Inside This Room based on writings by Joseph Campbell and Paulo Coelho.

Film composer
Hirschfelder's first score work was for the TV series, Skirts and Shadows of the Heart (both in 1990); Ratbag Hero followed in 1991.

He has composed scores for films including Strictly Ballroom (1992), Shine (1996), Sliding Doors (1998), Elizabeth (1998), Hanging Up (2000), Peaches (2004), Australia (2008), and Legend of the Guardians: The Owls of Ga'Hoole (2010).

He has worked numerous times with directors Ian Gilmour, Craig Monahan, Ann Turner, Roger Spottiswoode and Baz Luhrmann.

In 1999, the score for Elizabeth (composed for a 90-piece orchestra and a 40-piece choir) was nominated for an Oscar, and was honoured with a BAFTA award and an APRA award for Best Original Score. He also won the Best Score BAFTA in 1993 for Strictly Ballroom.

He composed for the opening ceremony of the 2000 Summer Olympics in Sydney.

Selective filmography

Discography

Charting albums

Awards and nominations

Academy Awards
 1997 Academy Award for Best Original Dramatic Score nomination for Shine
 1999 Academy Award for Best Original Dramatic Score nomination for Elizabeth

ARIA Music Awards
The ARIA Music Awards is an annual awards ceremony that recognises excellence, innovation, and achievement across all genres of Australian music. They commenced in 1987. 

! 
|-
| 1993
| Strictly Ballroom
|rowspan="5" | Best Original Soundtrack, Cast or Show Album
| 
|rowspan="5" | 
|-
|rowspan="2" | 1999
| Elizabeth
| 
|-
| The Interview
| 
|-
| 2000
| What Becomes of the Broken Hearted?
| 
|-
| 2001
| Better Than Sex
| 
|-

APRA Awards
The APRA Awards are held in Australia and New Zealand by the Australasian Performing Right Association to recognise songwriting skills, sales and airplay performance by its members annually.

! 
|-
| 1998
| Shine
| Best Film Score
| 
| 
|-
| 1999
| Elizabeth
| Best Film Score
| 
| 
|-
| 2008
| Children of the Silk Road
| Best Film Score
| 
| 
|-

References

External links

1960 births
APRA Award winners
ARIA Award winners
Australian film score composers
Best Original Music BAFTA Award winners
Best Original Song Genie and Canadian Screen Award winners
Little River Band members
Living people
Male film score composers
People from Ballarat
La-La Land Records artists